Ahmadabad-e Tefli (also Romanized as Aḩmadābād-e Teflī; also known as Aḩmadābād) is a village in Razab Rural District, in the Central District of Sarvabad County, Kurdistan Province, Iran. At the 2006 census, its population was 317, in 74 families. The village is populated by Kurds.

References 

Towns and villages in Sarvabad County
Kurdish settlements in Kurdistan Province